Olixon is a genus of wasps in family Rhopalosomatidae. Members of this family are parasitic of crickets.

Taxonomy
The genus contains the following species:

Olixon abrahami Krogmann, Austin & Naumann, 2009 
Olixon atlanticum Fernandez & Sarmiento-M, 2002 
Olixon australiae (Perkins, 1908) 
Olixon banksii (Brues, 1922) 
Olixon bicolor Roig Alsina & Martínez, 2010 
Olixon danggari Krogmann, Austin & Naumann, 2009 
Olixon dentatum (Cameron, 1904) 
Olixon ferrugineum Krogmann, Austin & Naumann, 2009 
Olixon flavibase Townes, 1977 
Olixon guyim Krogmann, Austin & Naumann, 2009 
Olixon harveyi Krogmann, Austin & Naumann, 2009 
Olixon helgae Krogmann, Austin & Naumann, 2009 
Olixon jandakotae Krogmann, Austin & Naumann, 2009 
Olixon jawoyn Krogmann, Austin & Naumann, 2009 
Olixon jenningsi Krogmann, Austin & Naumann, 2009 
Olixon kakadui Krogmann, Austin & Naumann, 2009 
Olixon majus Townes, 1977 
Olixon martini Lohrmann, 2007 
Olixon melinsula Lohrmann, Fox, Solis & Krogmann, 2012 
Olixon myrmosaeforme (Arnold, 1935) 
Olixon pilbara Krogmann, Austin & Naumann, 2009 
Olixon saltator (Arnold, 1935) 
Olixon testaceum Cameron, 1887 
Olixon toliaraensis Lohrmann & Ohl, 2007 
Olixon wajuk Krogmann, Austin & Naumann, 2009  
Olixon waldockae Krogmann, Austin & Naumann, 2009 
Olixon wuthathi Krogmann, Austin & Naumann, 2009 
Olixon zonale Krogmann, Austin & Naumann, 2009

References

Rhopalosomatidae
Hymenoptera genera
Taxa named by Peter Cameron